The Gary Sinise Foundation is a charity and veterans service organization that offers a variety of programs, services and events for wounded veterans of the military. It operates as a nonprofit 501(c)(3) organization. Among its programs is the construction of specially adapted smart homes for severely wounded veterans that are provided mortgage-free. From 2011 to 2021 the Gary Sinise Foundation has raised over $300 million for wounded veterans, first responders, and their families.

Founded in 2011 by actor Gary Sinise, the foundation serves all branches of the military at U.S. installations domestically and abroad.

To date, the Gary Sinise Foundation has built 81 specially adapted smart homes for severely wounded heroes, served more than 950,000 meals to America's defenders] across the country, and about 500 support concerts for our troops, sponsored by the foundation.

History 
Having grown up in a family of veterans, Sinise has been involved with supporting military veterans going back as early as the 1970s. After the September 11, 2001 terrorist attacks, Sinise became more actively involved in supporting the military.

In 2004, Sinise started the Gary Sinise & the Lieutenant Dan Band a cover band that has played over 500 shows around the world, visiting active-duty soldiers including Iraq and Afghanistan. The band has also performed for members of the military and their families to entertain troops and raise money for disabled veterans

On April 26, 2022, the foundation announced its headquarters would move from Los Angeles, California, to Franklin, Tennessee, in the mid-year.

References

External links 
 

2011 establishments in the United States
Organizations based in Tennessee
Non-profit organizations based in Tennessee
American veterans' organizations
Military-related organizations
United States military support organizations